John Pratt Elkin (January 11, 1860October 3, 1915) was an American lawyer and judge.  He served a term as the state's Attorney General, and was an associate justice of the state's Supreme Court.  He was a central figure in a scandal concerning influence buying on the Supreme Court.

Life and career
Elkin was born the son of Francis Elkin and Elizabeth Pratt.  The family moved to the village of Smicksburg in 1869, where Elkin received a rudimentary education.  In 1873, the family moved to Wellsville, Ohio, where the father opened a tin plate factory, and Elkin worked there in his early teens.  In 1875, the factory failed, and the family moved back to Smicksburg, where Elkin was hired as a teacher.

In 1881, Elkin studied law at the University of Michigan, graduating in 1884.  In 1884, he graduated, married Adda Prothero that summer, and was elected to the state House that fall.  Elkin was admitted to the bar of Indiana County in 1885, and served two terms in the state House, 1885–86 and 1887–88.

Elkin was appointed Deputy Attorney General in 1895, which he resigned under pressure in 1897.  He was also 1896 chairman of the state Republican committee, and had backed Senator Quay, the party's "kingmaker", for President.

Elkin was appointed Attorney General in 1899.

In 1902, Elkin tried to run for governor, and expected to win the Republican nomination on the first ballot, but Quay backed Judge Pennypacker and successfully bribed key Elkin supporters at the nomination convention.

In 1904, a vacancy arose on the state's Supreme Court.  Governor Pennypacker was nominated by his party to run in the special election to replace the vacancy, but he declined.  Elkin was then nominated and elected.  Elkin served on the bench until his death in 1915.

Controversies
The Secretary of the Commonwealth, Frank Reeder, and Elkin were forced to resign by Governor Hastings over an "indemnification" bill.  The pressure was claimed to be political maneuvering against Quay.

In 1899, when Quay was tainted with scandal and the state legislature refused to seat him, Elkin was his main defender in the General Assembly, and advised Governor Stone to proceed with the appointment.

In 1908, William Randolph Hearst published letters sent to various Pennsylvania officials by John Dustin Archbold, then vice-president of Standard Oil, suggesting judicial appointments.  The two letters addressed to Elkin mentioned $15,000 in donations.

References

Further reading

External links
 Biography by a descendant

1860 births
1915 deaths
People from Indiana County, Pennsylvania
University of Michigan Law School alumni
Pennsylvania Attorneys General
Pennsylvania lawyers
19th-century American lawyers
Pennsylvania Republicans
19th-century American politicians
People from Wellsville, Ohio